Devendra Prasad Gupta (2 January 1933 – 26 December 2017) was an Indian pre-democratic political sufferer, botanist and academician.

Early life and education
Hailing and raised from a family of Vaidhraj commonly termed as olden Ayurvedic physicians, he dynamically partook in Indian freedom movements of Civil Disobedience 1942 as a result of which his studies were discontinued for years. At the age of eleven years he became a member of Congress Seva Dal from 1944 to 1947. During this period he had been trained as a volunteer and subsequently turned out to be the Nayak/comrade of one unit.
 
He confronted bullets and suffered from gangrenous wound on the lower part of the left leg with bone exposed which temporarily incapacitated him for two months. The wound being stated was caused by the three bullets fired by British soldiers under their contingent military operation at Maheshkhunt, district of Monghyr in August 1942. He was even incarcerated and held as one of the captives led by seizure for a year.

On 24 August 1942 his grandfather Chulhai Sah faced the bullet of a British soldier in a raid at his house for extirpating railway track of Maheshkhunt station and met a martyr death. But in the midst of struggle and persistent hardship of all fellow-Indians they succeeded.

A freedom fighter who had to flee his hometown to avoid arrest for hoisting the Tricolour in his school during the Quit India Movement, he joined Ranchi University after a brief stint at the Patna University and University of London.

Professional life
Gupta was former Vice-Chancellor of Ranchi University. He strived for upliftment of local tribes and backward class. On his advice there was establishment of backward class student union. He commenced his academic career as demonstrator (August 1953 – August 1956) and went up to post graduate lecturer (September 1956 – March 1970), reader (April 1970 – January 1984), university professor (February 1984 till death), principal (June 1983 – January 1986) under Indian University. Gupta along with two professors co-founded and instituted special branch of Microbiology and Plant Pathology in Ranchi University, PG Department of Botany, currently operating under Institute of Basic and Applied Sciences.

He was associated with many International conventions such as First International Congress of Plant Pathology, held in Imperial College London, International Conference of Phytochemical Society, held in University of Hull, Scarborough, England and many others. He was one of the contributors from India who took part in the deliberation of the 3rd International Symposium on verticillium held on August 1981 in Bari, Italy.

He was ex-councillor of Indian Phytopathological Society, New Delhi and former member of Bihar Intermediate Education Council, India.

After retirement he served DPG-VeC. Genetics & Life Science, Nicaragua as a President and Bethany University, Scotts Valley, California, U.S. with other research universities/institutions as an academician and researcher.

Death

Gupta died due to pneumonia with sepsis at his residence in Ranchi on 26 December 2017. He was treated at Medanta hospital for femur fracture and had a prolonged stay in the ICU and Suite for his fluid, electrolyte, blood sugar and BP management. After explained prognosis he was taken up for surgical intervention. He responded well and was discharged in stable condition on 6 November 2017.

He was again re-admitted with complaint of poor oral intake and oral sensorium and was finally diagnosed with sepsis and pneumonia. He improved and responded well to the treatment, finally was discharged in a healthy state on 20 December 2017. On 26 December 2017 his condition deteriorated and he finally died in a peaceful state, seven days before his 85th birthday.

Legacy

Devendra Memorial Science Fellowship (DMSF) was instituted by DPG-VeC. Genetics & Life Science, Nicaragua to commemorate his contribution in the field of biology.

Selected publications

References

External links
 
 
 
 MEMBERS OF THE R.U. SENATE
 D.P. Gupta, Testimony From M. L. A., Patna (7 May 1951)
 Devendra Prasad Gupta, Ranchi University, Testimony From Minister Of Law (9 February 1955)

1933 births
2017 deaths
20th-century Indian botanists
20th-century Indian philosophers
Alumni of King's College London
People associated with Queen Elizabeth College
People associated with the University of London
Patna University alumni
Academic staff of Ranchi University
Vice-Chancellors of the Ranchi University
Scientists from Bihar
Scientists from Jharkhand
People from Gurgaon
Indian independence activists from Bihar
Prisoners and detainees of British India
Deaths from pneumonia in India